Two Guys (Korean: Tu gaijeu) is a South Korean comedy film directed and written by Hun-Su Park. Park Joong-hoon, Cha Tae-hyun, Han Eun-jung are the lead stars in this film.

Plot
This film is a hilarious chase of two thieves who steal a brief case containing expensive semiconductors from the mafia.

Cast
 Park Joong-hoon as Jung-tae
 Cha Tae-hyun as Hoon
 Han Eun-jung as Ji-seon
 Heung-chae Jeong as Eul-Baek
 Dae-han Ji as Yong-Sik
 Jun-yong Choi as Yang-Bok
 Hyeon-ju Son as Vice-Chief Lim
 Seung-hwan Shin as Soo-Hun
 Hyeok-jae Lee as RZ Card
 Yun-bae Park as customer
 Lim Seung-Dae as Vice-Chief Jung
 Kim Ku-Taek as Rin
 Hong Jin-Kyung as cameo
 Park In-hwan as Director Lee (cameo)

References

External links
 

2004 films
South Korean romantic comedy films
2000s South Korean films